St Patrick's Church, Nuthall is a Grade II* listed parish church in the Church of England in Nuthall.

History
The church is 13th century but was heavily restored in 1838. It was re-roofed in 1858 and again in 1884, when James Fowler carried out other restoration work including the addition of a vestry and organ chamber.

Organ

The organ is by Lewis. It was installed in 1871 but may have been a pre-existing house organ. A specification of the organ can be found on the National Pipe Organ Register.

References

Church of England church buildings in Nottinghamshire
Grade II* listed churches in Nottinghamshire